Randy Robbins (born September 14, 1962 in Casa Grande, Arizona) is a former American football cornerback in the National Football League. He played college football at the University of Arizona. A 4th round selection (89th overall pick) in the 1984 NFL Draft, Robbins played for the Denver Broncos for nine seasons (1984–1992).

His cousin is Mike Scurlock, who played for the St. Louis Rams and the Carolina Panthers.

External links
NFL.com player page

1962 births
Living people
People from Casa Grande, Arizona
Sportspeople from the Phoenix metropolitan area
Players of American football from Arizona
American football cornerbacks
Arizona Wildcats football players
Denver Broncos players